Neseuterpia couturieri is a species of beetle in the family Cerambycidae. It was described by Tavakilian in 2001.

References

Acanthocinini
Beetles described in 2001